Arteriosclerosis, Thrombosis, and Vascular Biology (ATVB) is a peer-reviewed medical journal published on behalf of the American Heart Association by Lippincott Williams & Wilkins, an imprint of Wolters Kluwer. It covers basic and clinical research related to vascular biology, pathophysiology and complications of atherosclerosis, and thrombotic mechanisms in blood vessels.

The journal was established in 1981 as Arteriosclerosis, which was published bimonthly. From 1991 to 1994 it was published monthly under the title Arteriosclerosis and Thrombosis: A Journal of Vascular Biology.

According to the Journal Citation Reports, the journal has a 2020 impact factor of 8.311, ranking it 8th in the category "Hematology" and 5th in the category "Peripheral Vascular Disease". Alan Daugherty has been the editor-in-chief since 2012.

Open access option 
ATVB offers an open access option for full-length, original contributions. The corresponding author may select an open access option during the first submission of the manuscript. All articles published under open access license will incur an article processing charge, with three open access options available.

All ATVB papers are available for free, full-text access after a 12-month embargo period after publication. Immediate access to full-text papers less than a year old requires membership of the American Heart Association or the American Stroke Association, or a paid subscription.

References 

Cardiology journals
Lippincott Williams & Wilkins academic journals
Monthly journals
Publications established in 1981
American Heart Association academic journals
1981 establishments in the United States